The following list of Carnegie libraries in Wyoming provides detailed information on United States Carnegie libraries in Wyoming, where 16 libraries were built from 16 grants (totaling $257,500) awarded by the Carnegie Corporation of New York from 1899 to 1917. As of 2021, 10 of these buildings are still standing, and 5 still operate as libraries.

Key

Carnegie libraries

Notes

References

Note: The above references, while all authoritative, are not entirely mutually consistent. Some details of this list may have been drawn from one of the references without support from the others.  Reader discretion is advised.

Wyoming
 
Libraries
Libraries